Henry Merrick (1837–1927) was an Ontario businessman and political figure. He represented Leeds North and Grenville North in the Legislative Assembly of Ontario as a Conservative member from 1871 to 1886.

He was born in Merrickville in 1837, the son of Stephen Merrick and the grandson of its founder, William Merrick. He operated the family mill for a number of years after his father died. Merrick served as mayor of Merrickville. He also served as Grand Master for the Orange Lodge in Canada. Merrick redeveloped the local foundry business after he retired from politics.

References 

Progressive Conservative Party of Ontario MPPs
1837 births
1927 deaths